Man in Gray was a noise rock band based in Brooklyn/New York City. Their debut EP, entitled No Day/No Night, received critical praise with much of the attention centered on the track titled "Incommunicado," which was listed by Village Voice music editor Chuck Eddy in the publication's annual critics poll. Their next effort was a split 7-inch EP with fellow New York band and Serious Business Records label-mate the Unsacred Hearts.

Discography 

 No Day/No Night (2004, EP - Serious Business Records)
 Man In Gray/Unsacred Hearts Split 7-inch w/ Unsacred Hearts (2005, EP - Serious Business Records)
 I Can't Sleep Unless I Hear You Breathing (2007, LP - Serious Business Records)

Tour dates

External links 
 Official Website
 Record Label
 MySpace Page
 Live show photos of Man in Gray by Space Monkey Photography
 The Gothamist Band Interview: Man In Gray
 Village Voice Review: No Day/ No Night EP
 Delusions Of Adequacy Review: No Day/ No Night EP
 Splendid Magazine Review: No Day/No Night EP
 Indieville Review: Split 7' EP
 Mystery And Misery Review: Split 7-inch EP
 Splendid Magazine Review: Split 7-inch EP
 Photographs by Jasper Coolidge

Indie rock musical groups from New York (state)
Musical groups from Brooklyn